Adrianne Ellis (born March 8, 1941) is a Canadian-born American actress.

Early life
Adrianne Ellis was born in Canada and raised in California, where she attended Van Nuys High School, where she was president of her Honors Drama Society. She went on to study at UCLA, where she distinguished herself in the theater and acted in the first student film directed by then fellow student Francis Ford Coppola.

Career
Ellis began her career in 1960, when she played Shirley on the TV series Dan Raven. In 1965 she played Myra Finlay in the Perry Mason episode, "The Case of the Cheating Chancellor". Other credits include the TV shows Suspicion, The Virginian and Morning Star (1965-1966), where she had one of the main roles, and the movie The New Interns.

During the 1960s she lived at the Hollywood Studio Club. Her roommate was model Gloria Dawn. Her other stage roles includes as Nora in The Doll's House, and Desdemona opposite William Marshall's Othello. She Adrienne produced a theatrical version of The Servant starring Keir Dullea at the former Bayview Playhouse in Toronto and co-produced, Rugged Gold, a family movie directed by Michael Anderson.

Personal life
Ellis was the wife of actor Glen Corbett (the screen name of Larry Holden). After her divorce from him, she married in 1977 British film director Michael Anderson (Around the World in 80 Days, Logan's Run).

Adrienne Ellis is the mother of actress Laurie Holden (The X-Files, Silent Hill, The Mist, The Walking Dead) and actor/assistant director Christopher Holden.

Select filmography

 The Tom Ewell Show (1960) .... Mrs. Sidney
 Dan Raven (episode Buy a Nightmare) (1960) .... Shirley
 The Detectives Starring Robert Taylor (episode Quiet Night) (1961) .... Ruth
 The Donna Reed Show (episode Military School) (1961) .... Claudette
 The Gertrude Berg Show (2 episodes) (1961) .... Laurie
 Straightaway (episode A Moment in the Sun) (1962) .... Jennifer
 The Dick Powell Show (episode 330 Independence S.W.) (1962) .... Connie
 The New Interns (1964) .... Nurse
 Billie (1965)
 The Alfred Hitchcock Hour (episode Thanatos Palace Hotel) (1965) .... The Young Woman
 The Virginian (episode Legend for a Lawman) (1965) .... Nora Buckman
 Perry Mason (episode The Case of Cheating Chancellor) (1965) .... Myra Finlay
 Morning Star (12 episodes) (1965–1966)  .... Jan Elliott
 Major Crimes (2013) (episode Pick your Poison) .... Irina Pushkin

References

External links

1941 births
American film actresses
Living people
Canadian emigrants to the United States
Actresses from California
University of California, Los Angeles alumni
American television actresses
20th-century American actresses
21st-century American actresses